Isn't It Grand Boys is a 1966 studio album by the Clancy Brothers and Tommy Makem. It was the Irish folk group's seventh album for Columbia Records and their tenth album over all. Tommy Makem wrote the liner notes.

The album reached #22 on the UK Albums Chart on 16 April 1966. It remained on the chart for five weeks.

Reception

New York Times music critic, Robert Shelton, praised the album for its sound quality and presence. About the singing, he noted: "The ensemble efforts have just enough polish to show a firm professionalism, and just enough rough edges to retain a native folk quality." He singled out the songs "Nancy Whisky," "Isn't It Grand Boys," and "Westering Ho" for their "hearty virility."

Track listing

All songs are traditional and were adapted and arranged by The Clancy Brothers and Tommy Makem, except where noted.

Personnel

Paddy Clancy - vocals, harmonica
Tom Clancy - vocals
Liam Clancy - vocals, guitar
Tommy Makem - vocals, banjo, tin whistle

References 

The Clancy Brothers albums
Columbia Records albums
1966 albums
Albums produced by Dave Rubinson